Geoff Vigar is Professor at School of Architecture, Planning & Landscape, Newcastle University. Currently he is the Director of Global Urban Research Unit at the university.

Research interests 
His research focuses on strategy development and implementation in land-use and transport planning, and the role and incorporation of social and environmental issues into governance practices in particular. His research centres on how governance institutions influence different policy pathways both in relation to planning and transport policy but also in wider City strategy-making.

Research projects 
 Development of Regional Transport Strategies in England including participant observation of the preparation process in North East England. 
 SINGOCOM: Social innovation in territorial development funded through the European Commission’s Fifth Framework Programme.

Publications 
 with Porter,G., (2005), Regional Governance and Strategic Transport Policy: the case of North East England, European Spatial Research and Policy, 12(1) pp89–108. 
 with Graham,SDN., and Healey, P., (2005), Searching for the City in Spatial Strategies, Urban Studies, 42(8), July. view abstract/article
 with Haggett, C. (2004), Tilting at Windmills, Town and Country Planning, October, 73 (10), pp288–290. 
 (2004), Researching Wind Energy Developments: Perspectives from Planning Theory, Working Paper for ESRC Tilting at Windmills project, Newcastle University: Newcastle.

External links 
 SINGOCOM 

Academics of Newcastle University
Living people
Year of birth missing (living people)